Leyndardómar Reykjavíkur 2000 (The Reykjavík Mysteries 2000) is a crime novel which was written by multiple Icelandic authors, each author writing one chapter. The novel received negative reviews.

The first chapter was written by Viktor Arnar Ingólfsson and then the subsequent chapters by Hrafn Jökulsson, Birgitta Halldórsdóttir, Arnaldur Indriðason, Stella Blómkvist, Árni Þórarinsson and Gunnar Gunnarsson. The final chapter was composed by Kristinn Kristjánsson. The book was printed in 8000 copies and distributed promotionally at bookstores. It was written in less than two months.

Kolbrún Bergþórsdóttir commented that the beginning by Viktor Arnar Ingólfsson is fast-paced and successful and the following chapter by Hrafn Jökulsson has the funniest section of the book. This is followed by a clunky chapter
by Birgitta Halldórsdóttir and a successful one by Arnaldur Indriðason. At that point there is a chapter by Stella Blómkvist which steers the story into such a cliché-ridden form that it can never recover. The story is ultimately "yet another addition to the failed crime stories which have been written in this country in the past few years" 

Katrín Jakobsdóttir commented that the initial chapter by Viktor Arnar Ingólfsson is skillfully written and also comments positively on the chapters by Arnaldur Indriðason and Stella Blómkvist. She describes the story as suffering from an overloaded plot and lack of verisimilitude. She is particularly critical of the characterization:

The Achilles heel of the work is the characterization. To begin with, the main character, Páll the policeman, is stuck in a cliché which Dashiell Hammett and Raymond Chandler popularized; he is a lecherous and drunk policeman with a constant hangover in his own private search for justice. The recipe for the character is one part Jack Daniel's stirred with one part sex. In Icelandic crime stories women have generally been even more clichéd and this book is very much in that spirit.

In a later work, Katrín observed that the book was an interesting experiment and even though it had not been particularly successful it was indicative of the rapidly increasing vitality of Icelandic crime literature at the time.

Notes

References

Sources cited

 
 
 
 
 

Icelandic novels
Crime novels
2000 novels
Novels set in Iceland
Collaborative novels
Icelandic-language novels